Gobio rivuloides is a species of gudgeon, a small freshwater in the family Cyprinidae. It is endemic to China.

References

 

Gobio
Fish described in 1925
Freshwater fish of China